Eagle, in comics, may refer to:

 Eagle (British comics), a British children's comic from the 1950s and 1960s, revived in the 1980s
 Eagle Comics, a US publisher of comic books reprinting 2000 AD stories
 Eagle (Wildstorm), a Wildstorm character from the series Red Menace
 Eagle, another Wildstorm character from the series Wildsiderz
 Eagle Award (comics), a British comic award also known simply as an Eagle
 Eagle: The Making of an Asian-American President, a manga by Kaiji Kawaguchi
 Richard Eagle, main character of the title Eagle, a black-and-white futuristic and mystical comic series, published by Crystal Comics then Apple Comics

It may also refer to:
 American Eagle (comics), a number of characters
 Angry Eagle, a Marvel Comics character and member of the X-People
 Blue Eagle (comics), a superhero
 Eagleman (comics), a DC Comics character
 Eaglet, the sidekick of the Nedor Comics American Eagle
 Golden Eagle (comics), a DC Comics character
 Phantom Eagle, two characters from Fawcett and Marvel Comics

See also
Eagle (disambiguation)

References